The X Factor is a British television music competition to find new singing talent. The third series was broadcast on ITV from 19 August 2006 until 16 December 2006. Louis Walsh, Sharon Osbourne and Simon Cowell all returned for their third series on the judging panel. Kate Thornton returned to present the main show on ITV, while Ben Shephard returned to present spin-off show The Xtra Factor on ITV2. After the semi-final on 9 December, Cowell became the winning judge even though the series had not yet finished, as two of his acts, Ray Quinn and Leona Lewis, became the two finalists. Lewis won the series on 16 December, with Quinn finishing as runner-up.

Instead of the earlier red and purple colour scheme, this year's theme was red and blue. A new-look website for the third series was launched on 11 August 2006. The final on 16 December brought in the show's then-highest ever audience, with 12.6 million people tuning in (a 56% audience share), and 8 million votes were cast, with Lewis receiving 60%. Lewis released a cover of Kelly Clarkson's "A Moment Like This" as her winner's single, and it went on the become the Christmas number one on 24 December despite only going on sale four days before on 20 December. It ended as the United Kingdom's second best selling single of the year. In January 2007, the single was awarded platinum status by the British Phonographic Industry. According to the Official Charts Company, the song has sold 895,000 copies in the United Kingdom as of December 2012.

Lewis emerged as the most successful contestant to appear on the X Factor having sold over 30 million records worldwide as well as being the only former contestant to be nominated for a Grammy.

This was the last series presented by Kate Thornton and the last time Ben Shephard presented The Xtra Factor. It was also the last series with only three judges (excluding times when a judge was absent).

Judges and presenters

Simon Cowell, Sharon Osbourne and Louis Walsh all returned for their third series on the judging panel. Kate Thornton returned to present the main show on ITV, while Ben Shephard returned to present spin-off show The Xtra Factor on ITV2.

This was both Thornton and Shephard's last series of The X Factor, as Thornton announced her departure on 8 March 2007 and was replaced for the fourth series by Dermot O'Leary. Shephard also quit the show after being passed over for promotion to main presenter. He was replaced by Fearne Cotton. This is the final series to feature just three judges on the panel; from series 4, it was increased for four.

Selection process

Auditions

Auditions began on 7 June 2006. Simon Cowell said on ITV's This Morning "The next international boyband or girlband is what I want to see in this year's show". 100,000 people applied to audition, the most so far. Nearly 20,000 attended an open audition at Old Trafford, Manchester on 18 June 2006.

All three judges, Cowell, Sharon Osbourne and Louis Walsh, returned. Hints by Cowell and the surrounding media that a fourth full-time judge mentoring a fourth category of contestants might be added proved to be false. However, American Idol judge Paula Abdul did make an appearance as a guest judge at the London auditions, and further celebrity guests appeared during the live shows. Auditions were held in cities around the UK and Republic of Ireland – London, Manchester, Birmingham, Dublin, Leeds and Glasgow. Cowell had also stated that there could be a 14–24s category but during the audition process the category was named as 16–24s, as in the previous two series. Cowell was given the 16–24s, Osbourne had the Over 25s, and Walsh mentored the Groups. (Both rumoured changes – the lowering of the age limit and the addition of a fourth category – were actually implemented in series 4.)

Bootcamp
It was originally intended that 21 acts (seven for each judge) should remain by the conclusion of the bootcamp stage. However, Cowell decided that he had made a mistake with his seven by failing to include Ray Quinn, and asked the producers to allow one more contestant or act to go through. The other two judges were then allowed to increase their quota to eight as well, giving a total of 24 acts.

Judges' houses
In the "judges' houses" round this was cut down to 12 to go through to the live finals. Avenue were chosen to go through but were later disqualified, having misled the judges over an existing record contract with a manager who was no longer associated with the show. As a consequence of this disqualification, Eton Road were put through in their place.

Judges Houses Performances 
Contestant highlighted in bold advanced
Over 25s:
  Ben: "With a Little Help from My Friends"
 Katie: "Anyone Who Had a Heart"
 Jonathan: "This Love"
  Robert: "Crazy"
 Tiwa: "Hero"
 Lyn: "Downtown"
  Kerry: "You've Got a Friend"
 Dionne:  "What's Love Got to Do with It"

Groups:
 Brother’s One: "Nobody Knows"
  The McDonald Brothers: "All I Have to Do Is Dream"
 Pure Liberty: "Crazy in Love"
 Dolly Rockers: "Round Round"
  The Unconventionals: "Dedicated to the One I Love"
  4Sure: "I Swear"
 Avenue: "Back for Good" (originally advanced but were later disqualified)
 Eton Road: "God Only Knows" (originally eliminated but advanced later)

16-24s:
 Ray: "Smile"
 Stacey: "I Don't Want to Talk About It"
 Ashley: "I Can't Make You Love Me"
 Shaun: "Ben"
 Gemma: "With You I'm Born Again"
 Leona: "Without You"
 Carlo: "Your Song"
 Nikitta: "Angel"

Acts 

Key:
 – Winner
 – Runner-Up

Avenue was originally chosen to go through, but were disqualified from the competition. Eton Road took their place at the live shows.

Live shows

Results summary
Colour key
 16-24s

 Over 25s

 Groups

Live show details

Week 1 (14 October)
Theme: Motown
Musical guests: Lionel Richie ("I Call It Love")
 Best bits song: "That's What Friends Are For"

Judges' votes to eliminate
Walsh: Dionne Mitchell – backed his own act, The Unconventionals.
Osbourne: The Unconventionals – backed her own act, Dionne Mitchell.
Cowell: The Unconventionals – stated that Mitchell had better vocals than The Unconventionals.

Week 2 (21 October)
Theme: Songs by Rod Stewart
Musical guest: Rod Stewart ("It's a Heartache")
 Best bits song: "End of the Road"

Judges' votes to eliminate
Walsh: Robert Allen – backed his own act, 4Sure.
Osbourne: 4Sure – backed her own act, Robert Allen.
Cowell: 4Sure – stated that Allen had taken the panel's advice and improved his vocals.

Week 3 (28 October)
Theme: Big band
Musical guest: Tony Bennett ("The Best Is Yet to Come"/"For Once in My Life")
 Best bits songs: "(You Make Me Feel Like) A Natural Woman" (Dionne Mitchell) & "Over The Rainbow" (Kerry McGregor)

Cowell appeared on GMTV on the morning of Wednesday 25 October and said that "something big is going to happen this week that none of the contestants know about – a change that will shake some of them up." It was revealed on the show that this surprise was to be a double elimination. The three acts with the fewest public votes were announced as the bottom three and then the act with the fewest votes was automatically eliminated. The remaining two acts then performed in the final showdown and faced the judges' votes.

Judges' votes to eliminate
Osbourne: Ashley McKenzie – backed her own act, Kerry McGregor.
Cowell: Kerry McGregor – backed his own act, Ashley McKenzie.
Walsh: Kerry McGregor – stated that McGregor had reached the limit of her abilities, whereas McKenzie still had potential to improve.

Week 4 (4 November)
Theme: Songs by ABBA
Musical guests: Björn Ulvaeus & The Cast of Mamma Mia! ("Mamma Mia" / "Dancing Queen")
 Best bits song: "You Give Me Something"

Judges' votes to eliminate
Osbourne: Ashley McKenzie – backed her own act, Robert Allen.
Cowell: Robert Allen – backed his own act, Ashley McKenzie.
Walsh: Ashley McKenzie – stated that Allen delivered a more polished performance on the night.

Week 5 (11 November)
Theme: Love songs
Musical guest: Julio Iglesias ("I Want to Know What Love Is")
 Best bits song: "One Moment in Time"

Judges' votes to eliminate
Osbourne: Nikitta Angus – gave no reason.
Walsh: Ray Quinn – stated that Quinn did not have a strong enough voice to be a recording artist.
Cowell: Nikitta Angus – gave no reason but stated that neither act deserved to be in the bottom two.

Week 6 (18 November)
Theme: Number ones
Musical guests: Westlife and Delta Goodrem ("All Out of Love")
 Best bits song: "Anytime You Need a Friend"

Judges' votes to eliminate
Osbourne: Eton Road – backed her own act, Robert Allen.
Walsh: Robert Allen – backed his own act, Eton Road.
Cowell: Robert Allen – stated that Eton Road could progress further in the competition than Allen.

Week 7 (25 November)
Theme: Songs from the movies
Musical guest: Il Divo ("Desde El Día Que Te Fuiste (Without You)")
 Best bits song: "Never Forget"

Judges' votes to eliminate
Walsh: Ben Mills – backed his own act, Eton Road.
Osbourne: Eton Road – backed her own act, Ben Mills.
Cowell: Eton Road – stated that Mills was more talented than Eton Road.

Week 8: Quarter-Final (2 December)
Themes: Songs by Barry Manilow; contestant's choice
Musical guest: Barry Manilow ("Everybody Loves Somebody")
 Best bits song: "He Ain't Heavy, He's My Brother"

The quarter-final did not feature a final showdown and instead the act with the fewest public votes, The MacDonald Brothers, were automatically eliminated.

Week 9: Semi-Final (9 December)
Theme: "Songs to get you into the final" (no specific theme)
Musical guest: Gloria Estefan ("Anything for You" / "Can't Stay Away from You" / "Rhythm Is Gonna Get You")
 Best bits song: "Let It Be"

The semi-final did not feature a final showdown and instead the act with the fewest public votes, Ben Mills, was automatically eliminated.

Week 10: Final (16 December)
Themes: Favourite performance ("song of the series"); celebrity duets; no theme; winner's single
Group performances: "Earth Song" (auditionees) and "That's What Friends Are For" (all finalists)
Musical guests: Take That ("Patience") and Shaun Rogerson ("Right Here Waiting")
 Best bits songs: "Smile" & "Without You"

Winner's single
Winner Leona Lewis's debut single was "A Moment Like This", and was released on 20 December 2006.

Reception

Ratings

References

 03
2006 in British music
2006 British television seasons
United Kingdom 03